Mission City is the eastern terminus station on the West Coast Express commuter rail line connecting Vancouver to Mission, British Columbia, Canada. The station is located on the north side of the Canadian Pacific Railway (CPR) tracks in Mission on North Railway Avenue. The station opened in 1995, when the West Coast Express began operating. 254 park and ride spaces are available at the station.

History
The first Mission City CPR station was built in 1882, at a site near St. Mary's Mission, further to the east. Subsequent railway stations were located at Mission City Junction on the western end of Railway Avenue, at the foot of Grand Street, slightly to the west of the current commuter rail station. First station at the junction was in 1885 and a second railway station was built in 1892 in the "Y" of the tracks. The most recent 1909 CPR station building, which had been recognized as a municipal historic site in 1982, was destroyed by fire in 1999.

Canadian National Railway and Canadian Pacific Railway have a track sharing agreement, with all freight trains operating eastbound through the station on the CPR tracks.

Services
Mission City is served by five West Coast Express trains per day in each direction: five in the morning to Vancouver, and five in the evening to Mission. In addition, rail service is supplemented by TransLink's 701 bus route. Eight of its daily trips (two in the morning, two in the afternoon, and four in the evening), are extended between Coquitlam Central station and Mission City station, running non-stop between Haney Place Exchange and Mission City station. Service does not run on weekends.

Bus routes

Bus bay assignments are as follows:

References

External links

Mission, British Columbia
Railway stations in Canada opened in 1995
West Coast Express stations
1995 establishments in British Columbia